Mylènium Tour is the third live album by Mylène Farmer, released on 5 December 2000.

Background 

After having ending her third successful tour whose last shows were held in Russia on 7 March 2000, Farmer rested, and then decided to release an album and a DVD retracing her concert. With Bertrand Châtenet, she participated in the audio mixing of the live album and also worked on the bonus available on the DVD. The album, whose release was originally scheduled for September, was finally marketed on 4 December, after several postponements, since its preparation needed a lot of time. The day before, the Fnac and Virgin stores of the Champs-Elysées organized a special evening by opening at midnight to allow fans to purchase the various supports of the album and the only single "Dessine-moi un mouton" which was released at the same time.

The album privileges the songs from the previous studio album Innamoramento, but also contains some songs from Anamorphosée and L'Autre..., and two B-sides. A medley composed of 1980s four hits of the first two albums is also available on the album.

Arranged by Yvan Cassar and produced by François Hanss, Mylenium Tour is the only album, which was not produced by Laurent Boutonnat.

Commercial performance 

In France, the CD went straight to number one on French Albums Chart, on 9 December 2000. It was dethroned the week after, but managed to stay on the top ten for 11 weeks. It disappeared from the chart (Top 200) on 8 September 2001, after its 31st week of attendance. On 26 September 2001, the album was certified Double platinum album for a minimum of 600,000 sales. It peaked respectively at #17 (it was released only three weeks before the end of the year) and #39 on 2000 and 2001 French Albums Charts.
The VHS and the DVD, also released in December 2000, were both certified Diamond videos for more than 100,000 copies sold (350,000 sales).

In Belgium Wallonia, the album entered the chart on 16 December 2000, at #14. It reached then #8, its highest position, but immediately left the top ten and remained on the chart (Top 50) for 13 weeks. It was ranked #68 on 2000 End of the Year Chart. On the chart edition of 30 April 2005, the album re-appeared for a single week, at #50, thanks to the release of Avant que l'ombre....

In Switzerland, the album achieved a minor success: it peaked at #31, on 17 December 2000, then kept on dropping and remained for seven weeks in the top 50 and for 12 weeks in the top 100.

Track listing

Disc one

 "Mylenium" (6:10)
 "L'Amour naissant" (5:28)
 "L'Âme-stram-gram" (6:00)
 "Beyond My Control" (5:18)
 "Rêver" (5:56)
 "Il n'y a pas d'ailleurs" (4:33)
 "Mylène Is Calling" (2:15)
 "Optimistique-moi" (4:22)
 "Pourvu qu'elles soient douces" / "Libertine" / "Maman a tort" / "Sans contrefaçon (Medley)" (6:49)
 "Regrets" (5:12)

Disc two

 "Désenchantée" (6:44)
 "Méfie-toi" (5:40)
 "Dessine-moi un mouton" (4:50)
 "California" (5:27)
 "Pas le temps de vivre" (7:08)
 "Je te rends ton amour" (5:15)
 "Souviens-toi du jour" (5:18)
 "Dernier Sourire" (4:53)
 "Innamoramento" (6:53)

VHS/DVD

 "Mylenium" (6:40)
 "L'Amour naissant" (5:26)
 "L'Âme-stram-gram" (5:43)
 "Beyond My Control" (5:21)
 "Rêver" (5:55)
 "Il n'y a pas d'ailleurs" (5:17)
 "Mylène Is Calling" (2:20)
 "Optimistique-moi" (5:43)
 "Medley": "Pourvu qu'elles soient douces" / "Libertine" / "Maman a tort" / "Sans contrefaçon" (6:45)
 "Regrets" (5:07)
 "Désenchantée" (7:54)"
 "Méfie-toi" (5:51)
 "Dessine-moi un mouton" (6:40)
 "California" (5:17)
 "Pas le temps de vivre" (8:26)
 "Je te rends ton amour" (5:16)
 "Souviens-toi du jour" (7:48)
 "Dernier Sourire" (5:23)
 "Innamoramento" (6:49)
 Générique de fin (4:28)

Notes
2 Only on the DVD
"Made in USA" (Dans les coulisses) (8:50), "Band & dancers" (3:40), "326 seconds" (Avant le show) (5:31), "Vous..." (4:50), "Made in Russia" (8:08)2
Bonus multi-angles: "L'Amour naissant" (4:38), "L'Âme-stram-gram" (4:27), "Rêver" (4:20)2

Personnel 
For more details about credits and personnel, see: Mylenium Tour (tour)

Laurent Boutonnat –  music
Yvan Cassar –  musical direction, keyboards
Éric Chevalier –  keyboards
Jeff Dahlgren, Brian Ray –  guitars
Jerry Watts Jr –  bass
Abraham Laboriel Jr –  drums
Johanna Manchec-Ferdinand –  background vocals
Esther Dobong'Na Essiène (aka Estha Divine) –  background vocals
Philippe Rault for Basilic Production Inc. –  consultant
Stuffed Monkey –  production
Bertrand Châtenet – mixing
Jérôme Devoise –  assistant
Thierry Rogen –  sound
Tim Young for Metropolis (London) –  mastering
Paul van Parys for Stuffed Monkey –  executive producer
Thierry Suc –  management
Claude Gassian –  photos
Henry Neu / Com'N.B –  design
 Recorded at Studio Mobile "Le Voyageur II"
 Mixed at Studio Guillaume Tell

Charts

Weekly album charts

Weekly DVD charts

Year-end album charts

Year-end DVD charts

Certifications and sales 

!colspan=3|Album
|-

!colspan=3|DVD
|-

Formats 

 Audio
 Double CD – Brass case
 Double CD – Collector edition with additional photos (30,000)
 Double CD – Promo
 Double CD – Promo – Statue
 Triple 12"
 Cassette – Double length1
 Double CD – Crystal case – Canada

1 Doesn't contain "Il n'y a pas d'ailleurs", "Mylène Is Calling" and "California"

Video
 VHS
 Plastic case with golden border
 Plastic case with dark golden border
 DVD

References 

Mylène Farmer live albums
Mylène Farmer video albums
Live video albums
2000 live albums
2000 video albums
Polydor Records live albums
Polydor Records video albums
Albums with cover art by H. R. Giger